Eendrachtsplein is an underground subway station in the center of Rotterdam. It is part of the Rotterdam Metro lines A, B, and C. The station is named after Eendracht Square (which is Eendrachtsplein in Dutch). It was opened on 10 May 1982. The station is located near several cultural hotspots, of which photos and location information are displayed on information panels on the station walls. Many party-goers head to this station, particularly on Friday and Saturday evenings, to dwell around famous cafés, bars and venues in neighboring Nieuwe Binnenweg, Oude Binnenweg and Westersingel.

The station is between Dijkzigt and Beurs on the East-West Line (formerly Caland line), nowadays lines A, B, and C.

References

Rotterdam Metro stations
Railway stations opened in 1982
1982 establishments in the Netherlands
Railway stations in the Netherlands opened in the 20th century